The Shaftesbury Theatre is a West End theatre, located on Shaftesbury Avenue, in the London Borough of Camden. Opened in 1911 as the New Prince's Theatre, it was the last theatre to be built in Shaftesbury Avenue.

History 
The theatre was designed for the Melville Brothers by Bertie Crewe and opened on 26 December 1911 with a production of The Three Musketeers. It was originally named the New Prince's Theatre, becoming the Prince's Theatre in 1914. The original capacity of the auditorium is unknown, but with standing room in the Stalls it is possible that over 3000 people were able to attend performances. The current capacity is between 1300 and 1400.

The Prince's was the last theatre to be built in Shaftesbury Avenue, and is located on the junction between Shaftesbury Avenue and High Holborn.

During the First World War, the Prince's advertised itself as ‘The Laughter House where you can forget the War.’

In September 1919, the theatre had considerable success with a season of Gilbert and Sullivan operas, presented by the D'Oyly Carte Opera Company. The success of these revivals led to a number of similar seasons over the next few decades, with the Theatre selling out every time. Other productions during this time included The Return of Sherlock Holmes starring Eille Norwood and a season of classical plays, including Medea and Macbeth, starring Sybil Thorndike. In 1928, Fred and Adele Astaire starred in Funny Face with Leslie Henson. The musical was a great success, but was cut short by a gas explosion on High Holborn outside the theatre.

Despite heavy bombing in the West End, and several periods of forced closure, the Prince's was able to continue a programme of shows during the Second World War. Many of these were presented by and named for Firth Shepherd, such as Shepherd’s Pie. Shepherd’s Pie was a comedic and musical revue of the kind that was popular in London theatres during the war, and was heralded as one of the most successful of its kind.

In 1948, Jack Hylton presented Burlesque starring Marjorie Reynolds at the Prince's. Hylton was also the producer for Buoyant Billions (1949), a play written by George Bernard Shaw when he was 93. In 1953, Hylton and Sam Wanamaker presented The Shrike by Joseph Kramm, and in 1955 Pat Kirkwood appeared at the theatre in Wonderful Town.

After a period of years presenting plays and musicals at the Prince's, Hylton was reported to have bought the theatre in 1961, but this was later corrected in the press. Hylton had been the lessee of the theatre in June 1961 and had negotiated the sale of the building to Television Wales and West. Two months later, TWW sold it on to Charles Clore and EMI, which changed the name of the theatre in 1962.

The programme in the 1960s under the ownership of EMI included a number of long- running musicals, such as the Broadway transfer How to Succeed in Business Without Really Trying (1963) and Our Man Crichton (1964), based on a book by JM Barrie. The theatre experienced a much less successful run with Lionel Bart’s Twang!! – a musical based on the story of Robin Hood which was plagued with creative and financial issues. Twang!! starred Ronnie Corbett and Barbara Windsor, and ran at the Shaftesbury for only a few weeks between December 1965 and January 1966. It was one of the most expensive flops that had ever been produced.

From 1968 to 1973 the Shaftesbury was host to the controversial musical Hair. The opening of the show coincided deliberately with the removal of the Lord Chamberlains powers of censorship over theatre in England, which allowed for the nude scene. While Hair was still running, the theatre was sold to a property development company called Peureula Investments. On 20 July 1973 the production was forced to close because a small section of the ceiling collapsed in the auditorium. There were allegedly plans to redevelop the theatre and the surrounding areas, and a campaign to save the theatre began. This included an occupation of the site. The Save London Theatres Campaign, led by actor Marius Goring, eventually succeeded in securing protected status for the Shaftesbury. In 1976, the Theatres Trust was formed by an Act of Parliament to promote the protection of theatres.

The theatre reopened with West Side Story in December 1974. Other productions in the decade included a musical stage version of Dad’s Army, starring Arthur Lowe, John Le Mesurier and Clive Dunn, and Dracula starring Terence Stamp, with scenic designs by Edward Gorey.

They’re Playing Our Song (1980–1982) starring Tom Conti and Gemma Craven was produced by actor and writer Ray Cooney. After a nine-month period of closure, Cooney presented Run For Your Wife with Richard Briers, Bernard Cribbins and Bill Pertwee. This was the first play under the banner of the Theatre of Comedy. The Theatre of Comedy became the lessee of the Shaftesbury, and later purchased the building. The company was jointly founded and financially backed by a group of distinguished actors, playwrights and producers including Tom Conti, Ray Cooney, Tom Courtenay, Bernard Cribbins, Judi Dench, Liza Goddard, Sheila Hancock, Nigel Hawthorne, Maureen Lipman, Derek Nimmo, Geoffrey Palmer, Donald Sinden, Eric Sykes and Michael Williams. The intention was for the Shaftesbury to have a programme of British comedy showcasing existing and new talent.

Notable runs in the 1980s included Pygmalion (1984) with Peter O'Toole, Two into One (1984–1986), a revue by Rowan Atkinson (1986), The Entertainer starring Peter Bowles (1986) and Stephen Sondheim’s Follies (1987–1989). From April 1989 there was a production of M. Butterfly starring Anthony Hopkins.

In 1986 Don Taffner became a significant shareholder in the Theatre of Comedy. Taffner went on to become the majority shareholder and chairman in 1992. Shows in the 1990s included Kiss of the Spiderwoman (1992-1993) with Chita Rivera, Eddie Izzard in Definite Article and Tommy, the musical by Pete Townshend and Des McAnuff (1996 -1997). From May 1998 the Shaftesbury was host to Rent, starring original Broadway cast members Anthony Rapp and Adam Pascal.

Recent history 
The venue is currently owned by the Theatre of Comedy Company. Successful shows in the 21st century have included the European premiere of Hairspray, which opened in October 2007 and ran for almost three years, winning multiple awards. Rock of Ages opened in August 2011 and From Here to Eternity, by Tim Rice, in September 2013. Beverly Knight starred in the West End premiere of Tony Award-winner Memphis in 2014.

Motown, which told the story of the Motown record label founder Berry Gordy, broke box office records and ran from 2016 to 2019. The show was both preceded and followed by short seasons of The Illusionists.

On 20 November 2019, the new musical & Juliet opened at the Shaftesbury Theatre following previews from 2 November. & Juliet retells the story of Romeo and Juliet using the pop anthems of Swedish songwriter and producer Max Martin. As a result of the COVID-19 pandemic, West End theatres were forced to close on 16 March 2020. The production reopened on 24th September 2021.

On 14 May 2021, it was announced that Be More Chill would open at the Shaftesbury Theatre for a ten-week run, with the original London cast reprising their roles and the run at The Other Palace being cut short due to the pandemic. The show opened on 30 June and closed on 5 September 2021.

Renovations 
The external facades of the theatre were renovated in 2010, and the original Edwardian canopy was uncovered and restored. In 2013 there was a project to lay the foundations and support structure for a new fly tower, construction of which was completed during the run of Memphis without disruption to the show's performance schedule. The new fly tower tripled the existing loading capacity in order to make the building fit for the technical demands of modern productions. The project garnered five major awards including from a National RIBA award and a Civic Trust award.

The Shaftesbury Theatre is currently undergoing extensive renovations to improve the public areas of the building. This project is occurring in conjunction with Camden's West End Project, which will include the pedestrianisation of the Princes Circus area immediately outside the theatre.

Notable productions 
 Mr Faint-Heart (1931)
 Orders Are Orders (1932)
 The Frog (1936)
 Summer Song (1956)
 The French Mistress (1959)
 How to Succeed in Business Without Really Trying (1963–64)
 Twang!! (1965–66)
 Hair (20 September 1968 – 20 July 1973)
 West Side Story (1974)
 Hello, Dolly! (1980)
 They're Playing Our Song (1 October 1980 – 8 May 1982)
 Two into One (1984)
 Follies (July 1987 – February 1989)
 Eartha Kitt - Live in Concert (March - April 1989 - three week sold-out run)
 Out of Order (1990)

Recent productions 
 Kiss of the Spider Woman (20 October 1992 – 17 July 1993) by John Kander and Fred Ebb, starring Chita Rivera
 Carousel (16 September 1993 – 27 March 1994) by Richard Rodgers and Oscar Hammerstein II
 Tommy (5 March 1996 – 8 February 1997) by The Who and Des McAnuff
 Rent (12 May 1998 – 30 October 1999) by Jonathan Larson
 Thoroughly Modern Millie (21 October 2003 – 26 June 2004), starring Amanda Holden and Maureen Lipman
 Bat Boy: The Musical (27 August 2004 – 15 January 2005) by Keythe Farley, Brian Flemming and Laurence O'Keefe, starring Deven May
 The Far Pavilions (24 March 2005 – 17 September 2005), starring Kulvinder Ghir
 Daddy Cool (15 August 2006 – 17 February 2007) by Frank Farian, starring Michelle Collins, Javine Hylton and Harvey Junior
 Fame: The Musical (4 May 2007 – 1 September 2007) by Jacques Levy and Steve Margoshes, starring Ian Watkins and Natalie Casey
 Hairspray: The Musical (11 October 2007 – 28 March 2010) by Marc Shaiman and Scott Wittman. Originally starring Michael Ball, Leanne Jones, Mel Smith and Tracie Bennett.
 Burn the Floor (21 July 2010 – 4 September 2010) starring Ali Bastian
 Flashdance (26 September 2010 – 15 January 2011)
 Comedy Rush (2 performances only: 24 February 2011 and 24 March 2011)
 Derren Brown – Svengali (8 June 2011 – 16 July 2011)
 Rock of Ages (27 September 2011 – 6 January 2013) transferred to the Garrick Theatre
 Burn the Floor (11 March 2013 – 30 June 2013)
 From Here to Eternity the Musical (30 September 2013 – 29 March 2014)
 The Pajama Game (2 May 2014 – 13 September 2014)
 Memphis (9 October 2014 – 31 October 2015)
 The Illusionists – Witness the Impossible (14 November 2015 – 3 January 2016)
 Motown: The Musical (11 February 2016 – 20 April 2019)
 & Juliet (20 November 2019 - 16 March 2020) - Closed due to the Coronavirus pandemic
 Be More Chill (30 June 2021 - 5 September 2021)
 & Juliet (24 September 2021 - 25 March 2023)
 Mrs. Doubtfire (12 May 2023 - 13 January 2024)

Nearby Tube stations 
 Tottenham Court Road
 Holborn
Covent Garden

References 
Citations

Further reading

External links 

 
 Scenes from the 1921–22 D'Oyly Carte season at the theatre
 Theatre of Comedy

West End theatres
Theatres completed in 1911
Theatres in the London Borough of Camden
Grade II listed buildings in the London Borough of Camden
Grade II listed theatres
Edwardian architecture in London
1911 establishments in England